Antelope Hill Provincial Park is a provincial park in central Alberta, Canada. It is located within Special Area No. 2 north of the Town of Hanna and east of Dowling Lake. 

Antelope Hill was officially designated as a provincial park by an order in council on December 4, 2014.

The park is home to animals such as the thirteen-lined ground squirrel, deer, red fox, porcupine, and elk. Birds such as the white-faced ibis, the American white pelican, and the Sprague's pipit also live at Antelope Hill.

References 

Provincial parks of Alberta
Special Area No. 2
Protected areas established in 2014
2014 establishments in Alberta